Tan Sri Dato' Indera Kamaruzzaman bin Shariff (born 18 May 1941) was the 5th Mayor of Kuala Lumpur.

Honours 

 Companion of the Order of the Defender of the Realm (J.M.N.) (1993)
 Commander of the Order of Loyalty to the Crown of Malaysia (P.S.M.) - Tan Sri (1995)

 Grand Knight of the Order of the Crown of Pahang (S.I.M.P.) - Dato' Indera (1998)

References 

Mayors of Kuala Lumpur
Companions of the Order of the Defender of the Realm
Commanders of the Order of Loyalty to the Crown of Malaysia